Jaylon Lawrence Johnson (born April 19, 1999) is an American football cornerback for the Chicago Bears of the National Football League (NFL). He played college football at Utah.

Early years
Johnson attended Central High School in Fresno, California. He played in the 2017 US Army All-American Bowl. He committed to the University of Utah to play college football. Johnson also played basketball in high school.

College career
As a true freshman at Utah in 2017, Johnson played in 12 games and made two starts, recording 25 tackles and one interception. He became a starter his sophomore year in 2018, starting all 14 games. He finished the season with 41 tackles, four interceptions and a touchdown. Johnson returned as a starter his junior year in 2019.  Following a junior season where he had 10 pass breakups and was named to the First-team All-Pac-12, Johnson announced that he would forgo his senior season and declare for the 2020 NFL Draft.

Professional career

Johnson was drafted by the Chicago Bears with the 50th overall pick in the second round of the 2020 NFL Draft. He signed a four-year rookie contract with the team on July 21. Johnson made his NFL debut in the Bears' Week 1 match up against the Detroit Lions. Johnson had six combined tackles and three passes defended, including a pass deflection in the endzone as time expired to secure the Bears' 27–23 comeback win. Johnson missed the Bears' final three games of the 2020 season due to a shoulder injury. Johnson finished his 2020 rookie season with 44 combined tackles, no interceptions, and 15 passes defended.

The following season, Johnson became the Bears' top cornerback after former teammate Kyle Fuller was released in a salary cap move. On September 19, 2021, Johnson recorded his first career interception after he picked off a pass thrown by Cincinnati Bengals quarterback Joe Burrow. Through the first two weeks of the season, on all passes to players he was covering, Johnson only allowed one reception, while knocking down three attempts and intercepting a pass. This earned him the highest rated pass coverage grade (an advanced stat that measures the ability to cover receivers) in the league through that point. On November 25, Johnson recorded a career-high 6 tackles and forced a fumble in a 16–14 Thanksgiving Day win over the Detroit Lions.

The Bears fired head coach Matt Nagy after the 2021 season and hired Matt Eberflus, who implemented a 4-3 defensive scheme. Johnson did not attend the team's voluntary offseason training session, and was subsequently placed on the second team defense behind Kindle Vildor and Kyler Gordon. He reclaimed his starting position during the team's mandatory offseason workouts. Johnson was placed on injured reserve on December 23 after breaking his right ring finger. Eberflus confirmed Johnson could have potentially returned, but the team did not want to risk Johnson injuring his finger any further. He started in 11 games for the Bears in 2022, where he recorded seven pass defenses and a forced fumble.

References

External links
Utah Utes bio

1999 births
Living people
Sportspeople from Fresno, California
Players of American football from California
American football cornerbacks
Utah Utes football players
Chicago Bears players